Palazzo Massimo may refer to:

 Palazzo Massimo alle Colonne, a Renaissance palace in Rome, Italy
 Palazzo Massimo alle Terme, a palace in Rome, Italy
 Palazzo Massimo di Pirro, Renaissance palace in Rome

See also 

 Massimo (disambiguation)